(Be mindful of our condition, Lord), BWV 217, is a church cantata, formerly attributed to Johann Sebastian Bach. It is now attributed to Johann Christoph Altnickol.

History and text 
The unknown composer wrote this piece for the First Sunday after Epiphany. The librettist is also unknown.

Scoring and structure 
The cantata is scored for SATB soloists and choir, flauto traverso, two violins, viola and basso continuo.

It has five movements:
Chorus: 
Recitativ (soprano): 
Aria (alto): 
Duet recitative and arioso (tenor and bass): 
Chorus:

Recording 
Alsfelder Vokalensemble / Steintor Barock Bremen, Wolfgang Helbich. The Apocryphal Bach Cantatas. CPO, 1991.

Notes

References 

Church cantatas
Bach: spurious and doubtful works
German church music